Yalvaç is a town and district of Isparta Province in the Mediterranean region of Turkey. Its population was 20,259 in 2010.

International relations

Twin towns - Sister cities
Yalvaç is twinned with:
  Bethlehem, Palestine

See also
 Antioch in Pisidia

Image gallery

References

External links
 Yalvac information Web site 
 Yalvaç Official Yalvac news page] 
 District governor's official website 
 District municipality's official website 
 Yalvac MYO 

Populated places in Isparta Province
Districts of Isparta Province
Towns in Turkey
Yalvaç District
Pisidia
Cittaslow